Wards Chapel is an unincorporated community in Atoka County, Oklahoma, United States. There are a few people, a few houses, and a church, Ward's Chapel Baptist Church. The community is located approximately five miles west of Atoka.

Unincorporated communities in Atoka County, Oklahoma
Unincorporated communities in Oklahoma

io:Atoka, Oklahoma